The Oregon Library Association (OLA) is a professional association based in the U.S. state of Oregon that promotes the advancement of library service through public and professional education and cooperation.

See also
Oregon State Library
American Library Association

External links 
Oregon Library Association 
Pacific Northwest Library Association

Libraries in Oregon
Non-profit organizations based in Oregon
oregon
1940 establishments in Oregon